Rüdiger Henning (born 5 November 1943) is a competition rower and Olympic champion for West Germany.

Henning won a gold medal in the coxed eight at the 1968 Summer Olympics in Mexico City, as a member of the rowing team from West Germany.

References

External links
 

1943 births
Living people
West German male rowers
Rowers from Berlin
Olympic rowers of West Germany
Rowers at the 1968 Summer Olympics
Olympic gold medalists for West Germany
Olympic medalists in rowing
World Rowing Championships medalists for West Germany
Medalists at the 1968 Summer Olympics
European Rowing Championships medalists
20th-century German people